The Advocate (French: L'avocat) is a 1925 French silent drama film based upon the play by Eugène Brieux, directed by Gaston Ravel and starring Rolla Norman, Mirales and Sylvio De Pedrelli.

Cast
 Rolla Norman as Louis Martigny 
 Mirales as Louis de Codrais 
 Sylvio De Pedrelli as Xavier de Codrais 
 Jeanne Méa as Madame Martigny 
 Sylviane de Castillo as Madame du Codrais 
 Irma Perrot as Pauline 
 Henri Maillard as Le Président Martigny 
 Nicolai De Seversky as Comte de Codrais père

References

Bibliography
 Alfred Krautz. International directory of cinematographers, set- and costume designers in film, Volume 4. Saur, 1984.

External links

1925 films
Films directed by Gaston Ravel
French silent films
French black-and-white films
French drama films
Silent drama films
1920s French films